Wiktoryna Józefa Bakałowiczowa, née Szymanowska (17 October 1835 — 30 October 1874) was a Polish theatre actress.

She was a well established female actress, who was said to earn as much as 10 rubles per performance.

In 1856, she married the painter Władysław Bakałowicz, and had a son named Stefan Bakałowicz in 1857. He also became a painter.

References

1835 births
1874 deaths
Polish actresses
19th-century Polish actresses